The Treason Act 1714 (1 Geo.I Stat.2 c.33) was an Act of Parliament of the Parliament of Great Britain passed during the Jacobite Rising of 1715 (but backdated to 1714: see Acts of Parliament (Commencement) Act 1793 for the explanation). Its long title was "An act for the more easy and speedy trial of such persons as have levied or shall levy war against his Majesty." It enacted that anyone who was in custody for high treason before 23 January 1716 could be tried anywhere in England, regardless of where they had allegedly committed their crime. Under common law a trial normally had to take place in the county where the crime happened. (The Act also preserved the right of peers to be tried by their peers.)

The Jurors (Scotland) Act 1745 extended the national jurisdiction in treason cases to all crimes of treason, whenever committed.

Another Act in 1715, 1 Geo.I Stat.2 c.50, enacted that anyone attainted of treason between 29 June 1715 and 24 June 1718 was to have their lands forfeited to the Crown for public use. Also, from 1 November 1716, any hereditary office they might have held was to be extinguished.

A similar Act was also passed for Scotland, 1 Geo.I Stat.2 c.20. This stated that if anyone with land in Scotland was guilty of treason because they had corresponded with the pretender to the throne, James III / VIII, they were to forfeit their lands to their vassal (if they owned the land) or to their landlord (if they occupied the land as a tenant), if that person was loyal to the Crown. However any person who stood to gain their land could not give evidence against them. If the loyal vassal or landlord did not claim the land within 6 months of the traitor's conviction, the land was to belong to the Crown instead, "for preventing frauds or collusion in order to evade this act." Any conveyance of land done since 1 August 1714, and any future conveyance done by anyone convicted of treason, was void. Creditors of the convicted traitors were not to be prejudiced by the Act.

References

See also
Security of the Sovereign Act 1714
Riot Act (1714)
Treason Act 1746
Correspondence with James the Pretender (High Treason) Act 1701
Treason Act

Treason in the United Kingdom
Great Britain Acts of Parliament 1714